Krysia Osostowicz  (born 1960) is a violin player who teaches at the Guildhall School of Music. She is the leader of the Dante String Quartet and principal violinist with the Endymion Ensemble. She previously played for 15 years with the Domus Piano Quartet. In 2021 she joined the Brodsky Quartet.

References

External links 
Hyperion Record Label

Women classical violinists
Academics of the Guildhall School of Music and Drama
Living people
1960 births
21st-century violinists
21st-century women musicians